Porthecla peruensis is a butterfly in the family Lycaenidae. It is found in northern Peru, on the east side of the Andes. It appears to be a montane species, since it has only been found at altitudes above 1,500 meters.

The length of the forewings is 15.9 mm for males.

Etymology
The name is derived from the country type locality.

References

Butterflies described in 2011
Eumaeini